Nick Hayden (born February 4, 1986) is a former American football defensive tackle in the National Football League for the Carolina Panthers, Cincinnati Bengals and Dallas Cowboys. He played college football at the University of Wisconsin and was selected by the Carolina Panthers in the sixth round of the 2008 NFL Draft.

Early years
Hayden attended Arrowhead High School, where he played as a defensive tackle, receiving All-State honors two straight years and the Defensive Lineman of the Year award in 2002.

He accepted a football scholarship from the University of Wisconsin–Madison. He became a starter at defensive tackle as a sophomore, registering 56 tackles, 5.5 sacks (led the team), one forced fumble, 4 passes defensed and 3 fumble recoveries. The next year, he had 27 tackles and one blocked kick. In his final season he posted 48 tackles, 4.5 sacks, 3 fumble recoveries (led the team), 2 passes defensed and one blocked kick.

In college, he started the final 39 games of his career, registering 132 tackles, 10 sacks, one forced fumble, 6 fumble recoveries (third most in school history), 6 passes defensed and 2 blocked kicks.

Professional career

Carolina Panthers
Hayden was selected in the sixth round (181st overall) of the 2008 NFL draft by the Carolina Panthers. In 2010, he became a regular starter (10 games) at left defensive tackle, registering 51 tackles, one sack, 2 quarterback pressures and one pass defensed. He was waived on September 3, 2011.

Cincinnati Bengals
On December 7, 2011, he signed as a free agent with the Cincinnati Bengals and played in two games before being declared inactive for the rest of the regular season and the playoffs. The next year, he suffered a high ankle sprained in the last preseason game and was waived injured on August 31.

Dallas Cowboys
After not playing in 2012, he was signed to a futures contract by the Dallas Cowboys on February 10, 2013, to provide depth in training camp. The many injuries the team experienced in the defensive line allowed him to move up the depth chart and be named the team starter at left defensive tackle. Hayden proved to be a reliable player by starting all 16 games an playing solid against the run. He finished the year with the most tackles (51) and snaps (821) registered by a Cowboys defensive lineman. He also had 16 quarterback pressures, 2 tackles for loss, one forced fumble, one fumble recovery and one touchdown.

In 2014, he started 16 games and led the team's defensive linemen with 52 tackles, while also registering 4 tackles for loss (tied for second on the team), 8 quarterback pressures and one pass defensed.

In 2015, he didn't start against the New England Patriots, when the team opened with only 3 defensive linemen. He posted 15 starts, 54 tackles (4 for loss), 5 quarterback pressures and 2 passes defensed. He wasn't re-signed at the end of the season.

Cleveland Browns
On July 22, 2016, he was signed as a free agent by the Cleveland Browns to play defensive end in a 3-4 defense, who were looking to improve the depth at the defensive line after Desmond Bryant was lost for the year with a torn pectoral muscle. He was released on August 29.

NFL statistics

References

External links
Once Wild Child, Hayden Now Determined Starter At DT
Carolina Panthers bio

1986 births
Living people
People from Hartland, Wisconsin
Players of American football from Wisconsin
American football defensive tackles
Wisconsin Badgers football players
Carolina Panthers players
Cincinnati Bengals players
Dallas Cowboys players
Sportspeople from the Milwaukee metropolitan area
Cleveland Browns players